A tornado emergency is an enhanced version of a tornado warning, which is used by the National Weather Service (NWS) in the United States during imminent, significant tornado occurrences in highly populated areas. Although it is not a new warning type from the NWS, issued instead within a severe weather statement or in the initial tornado warning, a tornado emergency generally means that significant, widespread damage is expected to occur and a high likelihood of numerous fatalities is expected with a large, strong to violent tornado.

These enhanced warnings are intended to convey the urgency of the weather situation to the general public, who are advised to take safety precautions immediately if they are in or near the projected path of a large tornado or its accompanying thunderstorm; tornado emergencies are usually identified following the preceding storm summary in the tornado warning product, which itself will denote visual or radar confirmation of "a large and extremely dangerous [or destructive] tornado" that is ongoing; precautionary action statements in the product also recommend that people in the storm's path find shelter in an underground shelter or safe room to protect themselves from the storm, if available.

While many tornadoes observed to be at or larger than ¼-mile in width have been documented to have produced catastrophic damage falling under the "strong" or "violent" categories (EF2–EF5) of the Enhanced Fujita Scale, there have been instances in which tornadoes of this intensity have resulted in very few to no fatalities and, occasionally, have produced damage corresponding to the Enhanced Fujita Scale's "weak" category (EF0–EF1).

History

First use 
The term was first used during the May 3, 1999 tornado outbreak that spawned an F5 tornado which struck the municipalities of Bridge Creek and Moore, located just south of Oklahoma City, followed by southern and eastern parts of the city itself, Del City, and Midwest City. On that day, between 5:30 and 6:30 p.m., David Andra, the Science and Operations Officer at the National Weather Service Weather Forecast Office in Norman watched as the large, destructive tornado approached Oklahoma City. This led to the issuance of the first tornado emergency, which in this instance was released as a standalone weather statement issued separately from the original tornado warning. As the large tornado approached western sections of the OKC metro area, we asked ourselves more than once, 'Are we doing all we can do to provide the best warnings and information?' It became apparent that unique and eye-catching phrases needed to be included in the products. At one point we used the phrase 'Tornado Emergency' to paint the picture that a rare and deadly tornado was imminent in the metro area. We hoped that such dire phrases would prompt action from anyone that still had any questions about what was about to happen.

Text of the Moore, Oklahoma Tornado Emergency from May 20, 2013
BULLETIN - EAS ACTIVATION REQUESTED
TORNADO WARNING
NATIONAL WEATHER SERVICE NORMAN OK
301 PM CDT MON MAY 20 2013

THE NATIONAL WEATHER SERVICE IN NORMAN HAS ISSUED A

* TORNADO WARNING FOR...
  NORTHWESTERN MCCLAIN COUNTY IN CENTRAL OKLAHOMA...
  SOUTHERN OKLAHOMA COUNTY IN CENTRAL OKLAHOMA...
  NORTHERN CLEVELAND COUNTY IN CENTRAL OKLAHOMA...

* UNTIL 345 PM CDT
    
* AT 259 PM CDT...NATIONAL WEATHER SERVICE METEOROLOGISTS AND STORM
  SPOTTERS WERE TRACKING A LARGE AND EXTREMELY DANGEROUS TORNADO NEAR
  NEWCASTLE. DOPPLER RADAR SHOWED THIS TORNADO MOVING NORTHEAST AT 20
  MPH.

THIS IS A TORNADO EMERGENCY FOR MOORE AND SOUTH OKLAHOMA CITY.

IN ADDITION TO A TORNADO...LARGE DESTRUCTIVE HAIL UP TO TENNIS BALL
SIZE IS EXPECTED WITH THIS STORM.

* LOCATIONS IMPACTED INCLUDE...
  MIDWEST CITY...MOORE...NEWCASTLE...STANLEY DRAPER LAKE...TINKER AIR
  FORCE BASE AND VALLEY BROOK.

PRECAUTIONARY/PREPAREDNESS ACTIONS...

THIS IS AN EXTREMELY DANGEROUS AND LIFE THREATENING SITUATION. IF YOU
CANNOT GET UNDERGROUND GO TO A STORM SHELTER OR AN INTERIOR ROOM OF A
STURDY BUILDING NOW.

TAKE COVER NOW IN A STORM SHELTER OR AN INTERIOR ROOM OF A STURDY
BUILDING. STAY AWAY FROM DOORS AND WINDOWS.
&&

LAT...LON 3524 9763 3532 9766 3547 9738 3527 9728
TIME...MOT...LOC 2000Z 236DEG 16KT 3530 9760 

$$

Standardization and recent usage 

After the original usage for the May 3, 1999 F5 tornado, the term Tornado Emergency was used by other National Weather Service Weather Forecast Offices (WFOs), although no uniform criteria existed and the issuance was entirely at the discretion of the forecaster issuing the warnings. Usage of the term varied from simply confirmed tornadoes in populated areas to significant, rare tornadoes causing severe damage and injuries. Some NWS forecast offices, such as the one serving the Des Moines, Iowa metropolitan area, have created standardized criteria and purpose for the usages of the heightened wording. Because data about the tornado and its exact path are often ascertained after the initial tornado warning is issued, this designation is usually added to the Severe Weather Statement (SAME code: SVS) that is used to follow up a tornado warning.

On April 2, 2012, the National Weather Service began an experimental program within its Wichita, Topeka, Springfield, St. Louis and Kansas City/Pleasant Hill offices in Kansas and Missouri called Impact Based Warning (IBW), which allows the respective offices to enhance warning information, such as adding tags to the warning messages which signify the potential damage severity. In regards to tornadoes, the creation of this multi-tiered system resulted in the implementation of an intermediate tornado warning product, a Particularly Dangerous Situation Tornado Warning.

On April 1, 2013, the IBW experiment expanded to include all National Weather Service WFOs within the Central Region; the IBW experiment was expanded again to include eight additional offices within the Eastern, Southern and Western Regions in the spring of 2014. Within the span of eleven days, the National Weather Service WFO in Norman issued tornado emergencies for parts of the Oklahoma City metropolitan area and central Oklahoma: first on May 20, 2013 for the EF5 tornado that struck Moore and portions of southern Oklahoma City, and again on May 31, for portions of eastern Canadian County and western sections of the immediate Oklahoma City area for another tornado.

In 2016, Impact-Based Tornado Warnings were implemented nationwide and all offices began standardized training and practice for tornado emergencies.  National directive allows for the use of tornado emergency products when a severe threat to human life exists and catastrophic damage is imminent or occurring.  

A tornado emergency was issued in the late-night hours of Memorial Day on May 27, 2019 for Montgomery County, Ohio, including the cities of Dayton, Ohio and Trotwood, Ohio. The tornado was rated EF4.

A tornado emergency was issued in the night hours of May 2, 2021 in Tupelo, Mississippi. It was part of a larger outbreak that spawned another dangerous tornado near Yazoo City, Mississippi.

The first tornado emergency ever issued in the Northeastern United States was issued by the National Weather Service in Mount Holly, New Jersey on September 1, 2021 at 7:04pm for Bristol, Croydon and Burlington when a confirmed large and destructive tornado was observed over Beverly heading towards the highly populated areas of Levittown, Trenton, and Hamilton Square. The alert for areas in Pennsylvania and New Jersey occurred as the remnants of Hurricane Ida passed through the region. The tornado was rated EF1.

On very rare occasions, tornado emergencies have been issued by local NWS offices that either do not verify a tornado touchdown in subsequent surveys or are based on false reports. One notable instance occurred on April 15, 2022, when the National Weather Service office in Little Rock, Arkansas issued tornado emergencies for several communities across six counties in north-central and northeastern parts of the state (including the towns of Viola, Cherokee Village, Walnut Ridge and Bono). Although strong rotation was detected in the storm as it crossed from south-central Missouri into north-central Arkansas, prompting tornado warnings for the supercell, surveys conducted that weekend by NWS Little Rock—which issued the initial emergency around 7:30 p.m. CDT, based on an emergency management report of a wedge tornado and damage to structures and trees near Hardy—indicated a tornado had not touched down and that damage produced by the storm was caused by straight-line winds and hail.

The area where the emergencies were issued were within coverage “dead zones” in the radii of NEXRAD radars based in Little Rock, Springfield, Missouri and Memphis, Tennessee; the supercell was within the highest beam tilt of each radar (ranging roughly 6,000–10,000 feet above ground level), impairing the ability of the radars to provide accurate wind velocity and correlation coefficient data, with large hail being produced by the storm contaminating the correlation coefficient data, producing lower values often indicative of lofted debris. The storm occurring at nightfall in a mostly rural area also complicated matters, with video taken by residents and posted on social media erroneously confusing a tube cloud that extended to near surface level for a tornado. Five days earlier, on April 11, NWS Little Rock issued a tornado emergency for Jacksonville and Cabot, based in part on reports of a large tornado on the ground in Jacksonville; although the storm—which was within  of the Little Rock NEXRAD site—did produce an EF1 tornado, the report of a large tornado that prompted the emergency, along with several additional damage reports associated with the storm filed with the NWS’s Little Rock and Tulsa, Oklahoma offices associated with that day’s convection, were later attributed to an Ohio woman who used a Spotter Network account with spoofed coordinates.

A tornado emergency was issued for the first time ever by the National Weather Service in League City on January 24, 2023 for Deer Park, Texas, after an unusual EF3 tornado impacted the cities of Pearland, Pasadena, Deer Park, and portions of Baytown.

The usage of tornado emergencies to alert major population centers to the imminent threat of a catastrophic tornado impact has also led to the development of the flash flood emergency which is similarly employed when severe flash floods threaten populated areas.

Criteria
With the national implementation of Impact-Based tornado warnings in 2016, common criteria were established for the use of tornado emergency.  National guidance requires the confirmation of a tornado via radar or spotter confirmation, with evidence the ongoing tornado is strong to violent. 

Local offices established criteria for tornado emergencies prior to this nationalization, such as:

The National Weather Service Weather Forecast Office in Des Moines, Iowa is one of the forecast offices to have created a set purpose and criteria for the usage of "tornado emergencies" in tornado warning products, which were made effective on March 12, 2010. According to the Des Moines office, the purpose of the tornado emergency wording is as follows:
 To motivate and provide a sense of urgency to persons in the path of this storm to take immediate shelter in a reinforced structure that offers maximum protection from destructive winds
 To communicate to state, local, and county officials and emergency responders that they should prepare for immediate search and rescue operations
 To communicate the need to prepare for immediate medical emergencies, evacuation measures, and emergency sheltering.
Before usage, the following criteria must be met:
 A large and catastrophic tornado has been confirmed and will continue
 The tornado will have a high impact
 The tornado is expected to cause numerous fatalities.

The National Weather Service Weather Forecast Office in Jackson, Mississippi defines a tornado emergency as "an enhanced Tornado Warning that will be issued by NWS Jackson when there is a heightened risk for a killer or violent tornado of EF3 rating or greater."
Their criteria for issuing a tornado emergency are:
 Radar indication of a strong tornado
 Reliable reports of significant damage or a large tornado
 Environmental conditions supportive of strong tornadoes, which is usually the case when a Particularly Dangerous Situation Tornado Watch is in effect.

The National Weather Service office in Nashville, Tennessee also created criteria to declare a tornado emergency within a tornado warning statement effective January 1, 2011. It states, "Tornado Emergency can be inserted in the third bulletin of the initial tornado warning (TOR) or in a severe weather statement (SVS)." Before the phrase can be used:
 A confirmed large tornado doing significant damage must be going through a highly populated area
 Radar must indicate tornadic debris
 The tornado must be expected to cause significant, widespread damage and loss of life.

Tornado safety

It is recommended that people in the path of a large and violent tornado, whether referenced in a tornado warning or a tornado emergency, seek shelter in a basement, cellar or safe room, as stronger tornadoes (particularly those significant enough to warrant the inclusion of a tornado emergency declaration within a tornado warning) pose a significant risk of major injury or death for people above ground level. Those who do not have below-ground shelter are still advised to take cover in a room in the center of the home on the lowest floor, and cover themselves with some type of thick padding (such as mattresses or blankets), to protect against falling debris in the event that the roof and ceiling collapse.

See also
 List of United States tornado emergencies
 Tornado warning
 List of tornadoes and tornado outbreaks

References

Weather warnings and advisories
Tornado